Peter Michael Commette (born March 13, 1954) is an American sailor who competed in the 1976 Summer Olympics. He raced Finn and finished in 11th place.

He also was champion and 1st in 1974 in the first Laser World Championships; 2nd in 470 World Championships; North American champion in Finn; U.S. National champion in Snipe (1985), 2nd in U.S. E-Scow National Championship; 3rd, 5th, 7th in Snipe World Championships and Bronze Medal in Pan-American Games.

References

1954 births
American male sailors (sport)
Living people
Laser class world champions
Olympic sailors of the United States
People from Bronxville, New York
Sailors at the 1976 Summer Olympics – Finn
Snipe class sailors
Tufts Jumbos sailors
Pan American Games bronze medalists for the United States
Pan American Games medalists in sailing
World champions in sailing for the United States
Sailors at the 1991 Pan American Games
Medalists at the 1991 Pan American Games